The Wimpy Kid Movie Diary is a non-fiction movie tie-in book by Jeff Kinney about the making of the 2010 movie Diary of a Wimpy Kid, which stars Zachary Gordon as Greg and Robert Capron as Rowley.

Background
It starts off with how the series was created. Next, it shows how they gradually prepared the movie for filming, such as choosing the cast, writing the script, and finding the right location.

When it talks about filming, other subjects are woven within, especially the actors' downtime and designing props. It also has some reflections about the actors leaving before it talks about post-production. The book ends with the release of the film and a "scrapbook."

The book was updated with behind the scenes info of Diary of a Wimpy Kid: Rodrick Rules and Diary of a Wimpy Kid: Dog Days, each gaining short sections. A sequel for behind the scenes info of Diary of a Wimpy Kid: The Long Haul was published in 2017 as "The Next Chapter".

See also

 Diary of a Wimpy Kid (series)
 Diary of a Wimpy Kid (film)
 Diary of a Wimpy Kid: Rodrick Rules (film)
 Diary of a Wimpy Kid: Dog Days (film)

References

Diary of a Wimpy Kid
2010 non-fiction books
Books about film
Amulet Books books